Prospect Park Historic District may refer to:

in the United States (by state)
Prospect Park Historic District (Davenport, Iowa)
Prospect Park Second Plat Historic District. Des Moines, Iowa
Prospect Park Farm, Chapman, Kansas, listed on the NRHP in Kansas
Prospect Park (Holyoke, Massachusetts), a park and historic district
Prospect Park Residential Historic District, Minneapolis, Minnesota
Prospect Park Water Tower and Tower Hill Park, Minneapolis, Minnesota
Prospect Park (Brooklyn), New York, a park and historic district
Prospect Park South Historic District, Brooklyn, New York